Grevillea cirsiifolia, commonly known as varied-leaf grevillea, is a species of flowering plant in the family Proteaceae and is endemic to the south-west of Western Australia. It is a prostrate shrub, usually with divided leaves with eight to thirty lobes, and creamy white and bright yellow flowers with a white to pale yellow style.

Description
The lower surface of the leaves is silky-hairy.

Taxonomy
Grevillea cirsiifolia was first formally described in 1848 by Carl Meissner in Johann Georg Christian Lehmann's Plantae Preissianae from specimens collected by James Drummond in the Swan River Colony. The specific epithet (cirsiifolia) means "Cirsium-leaved".

Distribution and habitat
Varied-leaf grevillea grows in woodland, often near winter-wet areas and is found from near Darkan to Mount Lindesay near Denmark in the Avon Wheatbelt, Jarrah Forest, Mallee and Warren biogeographic regions of Western Australia.

Conservation status
This grevillea is listed as "not threatened" by the Department of Biodiversity, Conservation and Attractions,

See also
 List of Grevillea species

References

cirsiifolia
Proteales of Australia
Eudicots of Western Australia
Taxa named by Carl Meissner
Plants described in 1848